The 2001 Boost Mobile V8 International was the twelfth round of the 2001 Shell Championship Series. This was the first V8 Supercar event in New Zealand since the 1996 Mobil New Zealand Sprints and the first time as part of the official calendar. It was held on the weekend of 9 to 11 November at Pukekohe Park Raceway in New Zealand.

Race report 

The 2001 Boost Mobile V8 International heralded the first ever overseas championship event for the V8 Supercar series, although it wasn't the first time that V8 Supercar racing was held at the Pukekohe Park Raceway. In 1996, the Mobil New Zealand Sprints saw the V8 Supercars come across the ditch for the first time, although these events were not part of the 1996 Australian Touring Car Championship calendar.

In these events, Greg Murphy dominated the weekend at Pukekohe, grabbing three race wins from three and entered the weekend with high expectations. After grabbing provisional pole position, he went on to convert that into a top-ten shootout pole - a first for the 2001 season.

The first race was cut short due to torrential downpour which saw cars struggling for grip and reduced visibility down to dangerous levels. Murphy was declared the winner with the race being cut short by five laps. The race also saw Jason Richards and Team Kiwi Racing achieve their best result of the season with a fourth-placed finish.

Race results

Qualifying

Top Ten Shootout

Race 1

Race 2

Race 3

Championship Standings

External links
 PlaceMakers V8 Supercars website

Boost Mobile
Boost Mobile